Massachusetts's 4th congressional district is located mostly in southern Massachusetts. It is represented by Democrat Jake Auchincloss. Auchincloss was first elected in 2020.

The district covers much of the area included in the  before the 1992 redistricting. In prior years, the district stretched from Brookline to Fitchburg. The shape of the district underwent some changes effective from the elections of 2012, after Massachusetts congressional redistricting to reflect the 2010 census. Most of Plymouth County and the South Coast are included in the new 9th district. The new 4th district has expanded westward to include towns along the Rhode Island border that had been in the old 3rd district.

For a very brief time (1793–95) it represented part of the District of Maine.

Recent election results from  statewide races

List of members representing the district

Recent election results

2002

2004

2006

2008

2010

2012

2014

2016

2018

2020

2022

Notes

References

 
 
 Congressional Biographical Directory of the United States 1774–present

External links

Maps
 Map of Massachusetts's 4th Congressional District, via Massachusetts Secretary of the Commonwealth

Election results
 CNN.com 2004 election results
 CNN.com 2006 election results
 US House of Representatives Clerk's Office, 2006 election results 
 US House of Representatives Clerk's Office, 2008 election results
 Massachusetts U.S. Congress 2010 Election Results

Government of Bristol County, Massachusetts
04
Government of Middlesex County, Massachusetts
Government of Norfolk County, Massachusetts
Government of Plymouth County, Massachusetts
1789 establishments in Massachusetts
Constituencies established in 1789